The 6th AVN Awards ceremony, organized by Adult Video News (AVN), took place on January 9, 1989, at the Tropicana Hotel and Casino in Paradise, Nevada. During the ceremony, AVN Awards were presented in 41 categories, plus several extra awards, honoring pornographic films released between January 1, 1988, and December 31, 1988.

Cat Woman, a shot-on-video feature, won the most awards, with five, while Best Film went to Pretty Peaches II, which won four awards.

Winners and nominees

The nominees for the 6th AVN Awards were announced in the January 1989 issue of Adult Video News magazine. Three movies, Amanda by Night II, Portrait of an Affair and Pretty Peaches II, each had 10 nominations, the most for the year.

The winners were announced during the awards ceremony on January 9, 1989.

Awards

Winners are listed first, highlighted in boldface, and indicated with a double dagger.

{| class=wikitable
|-
! style="background:#89cff0" width="50%" | Best Feature Film
! style="background:#89cff0" width="50%" | Best Shot-on-Video Feature
|-
| valign="top" |
 Pretty Peaches II
 Amanda by Night II
 Deep Inside Trading
 Miami Spice II
 Portrait of an Affair
| valign="top" |
 Cat Woman
 Addicted to Love
 Black Widow
 Case of the Sensuous Sinners
 The Final Taboo
 Ghostess with the Mostess
 Maxine
 Raw Talent III
 Sinners
 Taboo VI
|-
! style="background:#89cff0" width="50%" | Best New Starlet
! style="background:#89cff0" width="50%" | Best Actor—Gay Video
|-
| valign="top" |
 Aja
 Kascha
 Lynn LeMay
 Charli St. Cyre
 Amanda Tyler
| valign="top" |
 Kevin Glover, The Next Valentino
 Tom Brock, They Grow ‘Em Big
 Randy Cochran, Making It Big
 Steve Hammond, Touch Me
 Jon Vincent, Heavenly
|-
! style="background:#89cff0" width="50%" | Best Actor—Feature Film
! style="background:#89cff0" width="50%" | Best Actress—Feature Film
|-
| valign="top" |
 Robert Bullock, Portrait of an Affair
 John Leslie, Miami Spice II
 Herschel Savage, Amanda by Night II
| valign="top" |
 Ona Zee, Portrait of an Affair
 Siobhan Hunter, Pretty Peaches II
 Krista Lane, Deep Inside Trading
|-
! style="background:#89cff0" width="50%" | Best Actor—Shot-on-Video Feature
! style="background:#89cff0" width="50%" | Best Actress—Shot-on-Video Feature
|-
| valign="top" |
 Jon Martin, Case of the Sensuous Sinners
 Buck Adams, Rockey X—The Final Round
 Robert Bullock, Maxine
 Jesse Eastern, Beverly Thrillbillies
 John Leslie, Dy Nasty
 John Leslie, Addicted to Love
 Joey Silvera, Angel Puss
 Randy Spears, Portrait of a Nymph
 Paul Thomas, Sinners
 Randy West, The Young and the Wrestling
| valign="top" |
 Barbara Dare, Naked Stranger
 Tracey Adams, Talk Dirty To Me, Part VI
 Eva Allen, Ghostess with the Mostess
 Champagne, Dreams in the Forbidden Zone
 Nina Hartley, Taboo VI
 Angel Kelly, Addicted to Love
 Ariel Knight, Candy’s Little Sister Sugar
 Porsche Lynn, Maxine
 Shanna McCullough, Babylon Pink II
 Laurie Smith, Sinners
|-
! style="background:#89cff0" width="50%" | Best Supporting Actor—Feature Film
! style="background:#89cff0" width="50%" | Best Supporting Actress—Feature Film
|-
| valign="top" |
 Jamie Gillis, Pretty Peaches II
 Robert Bullock, Amanda by Night II
 Billy Dee, Amanda by Night II
 Mike Horner, Portrait of an Affair
 Peter North, Pretty Peaches II
| valign="top" |
 Nina Hartley, Portrait of an Affair
 Tracey Adams, Pretty Peaches II
 Crystal Breeze, Head Waitress
 Siobhan Hunter, Deep Inside Trading
 Krista Lane, Portrait of an Affair
|-
! style="background:#89cff0" width="50%" | Best Supporting Actor—Shot-on-Video Feature
! style="background:#89cff0" width="50%" | Best Supporting Actress—Shot-on-Video Feature
|-
| valign="top" |
 Richard Pacheco, Sensual Escape
 Randy Paul, The Horneymooners
 Rick Savage, Black Widow
 Randy Spears, Case of the Sensuous Sinners
 Ray Victory, Cat Woman
| valign="top" |
 Jacqueline Lorians, Beauty and the Beast
 Kimberly Carson, Sinners
 Nina Hartley, Sensual Escape
 Lynn LeMay, Power Blonde
 Sharon Mitchell, Maxine
 Alicia Monet, Goin’ Down Slow
 Britt Morgan, Taboo VI
 Ona Zee, Raw Talent III
|-
! style="background:#89cff0" width="50%" | Best Director—Feature Film
! style="background:#89cff0" width="50%" | Best Director—Shot-on-Video Feature
|-
| valign="top" |
 Alex de Renzy, Pretty Peaches II
 Jack Remy, Amanda by Night II
 L. Vincent Revene, Deep Inside Trading
 Anthony Spinelli, Portrait of an Affair
 Svetlana, Miami Spice II
| valign="top" |
 John Leslie, Cat Woman
 Alex de Renzy, Ghostess with the Mostess
 Scotty Fox, Case of the Sensuous Sinners
 Cecil Howard, Sinners
 Robert McCallum, Taboo VI
 Henri Pachard, Talk Dirty to Me, Part VI
 Jay Paul, Raw Talent III
 Candida Royalle, Gloria Leonard, Per Sjostedt; Sensual Escape
 Anthony Spinelli, The Last Condom
 Paul Thomas, Addicted to Love
|-
! style="background:#89cff0" width="50%" | Best Director—Bisexual Video
! style="background:#89cff0" width="50%" | Best Director—Gay Video
|-
| valign="top" |
 Paul Norman, Bi and Beyond
 Richard Mailer, Switch Hitters III
 Paul Norman, Bi and Beyond II
| valign="top" |
 Jim West, The Next Valentino
 Jean-Daniel Cadinot, Getting Even
 Gunnar Hyde, Minute Man, Series 3
 Scott Masters, Head of the Class
 John Travis, They Grow ‘Em Big
|-
! style="background:#89cff0" width="50%" | Best All-Sex Video
! style="background:#89cff0" width="50%" | Best Compilation Tape
|-
| valign="top" |
 Angel Puss
 Black Fox
 Caught from Behind 8
 Dreams in the Forbidden Zone
 Matched Pairs
| valign="top" |
 Only the Best of Men's and Women's Fantasies
 All My Best, Barbara
 The Big Sleazy
 Eroticism in Black
 Forbidden Worlds
 No Man’s Land
 Only the Best of Breasts
 Rachel Ryan
|-
! style="background:#89cff0" width="50%" | Best Foreign Release
! style="background:#89cff0" width="50%" | Best Specialty Tape
|-
| valign="top" |
 Devil in Mr. Holmes
 Bored Games
 Cocktail Party
 Insatiable Janine
 Outrageous Games
| valign="top" |
 Loose Ends IV
 Anal Pleasures
 Barbii Bound
 Caught from Behind 8
 Loose Ends V
|-
! style="background:#89cff0" width="50%" | Best Softcore Film
! style="background:#89cff0" width="50%" | Best Made-for-Video Softcore Release
|-
| valign="top" |
 Erotic Dreams
 The Big Bet
 Infamous Daughter of Fanny Hill
 A Man in Love
 Takin' It All Off
| valign="top" |
 Playboy Playmate Calendar—1989
 Drive-in Matinee
 Encounters III
 Sheer Heaven
 Sizzling Spring Break Girls
|-
! style="background:#89cff0" width="50%" | Best Bisexual Video
! style="background:#89cff0" width="50%" | Best Gay Video
|-
| valign="top" |
 Bi and Beyond
 Bi and Beyond II
 Split Decision
 Switch Hitters III
| valign="top" |
 Touch Me
 Minute Man, Series 3
 The Next Valentino
 Northwest Passage
 Top Man
|-
! style="background:#89cff0" width="50%" | Best Featurette Tape (Series)
! style="background:#89cff0" width="50%" | Best Selling/Renting Adult Tapes of the Year
|-
| valign="top" |
 Star Director's Series—Sensual Escape
 Parliament Video Magazine Line
 Teasers Home Video—First 6 Vol.
| valign="top" |
Plaques were awarded for Best Selling Adult Tape of the Year to Miami Spice II and for Best Renting Adult Tapes of the Year to Devil in Mr. Holmes.
|-
! style="background:#89cff0" width="50%" | Best Non-Sexual Performance
! style="background:#89cff0" width="50%" | Best Sex Scene—Feature Film
|-
| valign="top" |
 Jose Duval, Pillowman
 Jack Baker, Debbie, Class of ’88
 Scott Baker, Raw Talent III
 Long Chainey, The Sex Life of Mata Hari
 William Margold, Born to Burn
| valign="top" |
 Nina Hartley, Herschel Savage; Amanda by Night II
 Krista Lane, Mike Horner; Amanda by Night II
 Candie Evans, Marc Wallice; Boiling Desires
 Ona Zee, Nina Hartley; Portrait of an Affair
 Janette Littledove, Buck Adams; Pretty Peaches II
|-
! style="background:#89cff0" width="50%" | Best Sex Scene—Shot-on-Video Feature (Couple)
! style="background:#89cff0" width="50%" | Best Sex Scene—Shot-on-Video Feature (Group)
|-
| valign="top" |
 Nina Hartley, Richard Pacheco; Sensual Escape
 Angel Kelly, Joey Silvera; Addicted to Love
 Janette Littledove, Buck Adams; Amorous Adventures of Littledove
 Kathleen Jentry, Joey Silvera; Bar scene, Cat Woman
 Kathleen Jentry, John Stagliano; Dance Fire
 Eva Allen, Tom Byron; Ghostess with the Mostess
 Barbara Dare, Tom Byron; Naked Stranger
 Alicia Monet, Joey Silvera; Suzie Superstar—The Search Continues
 Nina Hartley, Joey Silvera; Taboo VI
 Samantha Strong, Mike Horner; Watch Me Sparkle
| valign="top" |
 Aja, Dana Lynn, Lisa Bright, Blake Palmer, Joey Silvera; Seance/orgy scene, Ghostess with the Mostess
 Shanna McCullough, Peter North, Tom Byron, Joey Silvera; Angel Puss
 Trinity Loren, Nina DePonca, Shane Hunter; Dream sequence, Dreams in the Forbidden Zone
 Shanna McCullough, Ariel Knight, John Leslie; Dy Nasty
 Stephanie Rage, Damien Cashmere, bikers; Heiress
 Shanna McCullough, Mike Horner, Megan Leigh; Love Lies
 Stephanie Rage, Ona Zee, Rick Savage; Raw Talent III
 Jerry Butler, others; Subway sequence, Raw Talent III
 Barbara Dare, Jennifer Miles, Stephen Ray; Sex in Dangerous Places
 Aja, Peter North, Trinity Loren; Surfside Sex
|-
! style="background:#89cff0" width="50%" | Best Screenplay—Feature Film
! style="background:#89cff0" width="50%" | Best Screenplay—Shot-on-video Feature
|-
| valign="top" |
 Harold Lime, Amanda by Night II
 Marty Anderson, Mark Ubell; Deep Inside Trading
 Phil Cara, Miami Spice II
 Michael Ellis, Portrait of an Affair
 Alex de Renzy, Pretty Peaches II
| valign="top" |
 Mark Weiss, John Leslie; Cat Woman
 Mark Cushman, Paul Thomas; Addicted to Love
 Paul Thomas, Black Widow
 Cash Markman, Chad Randolph; Case of the Sensuous Sinners
 Michelle Stevens, The Final Taboo
 John Leslie, Goin’ Down Slow
 Guy Strangeways, Invasion of the Samurai Sluts from Hell
 Michael Ellis, The Last Condom
 Joyce Snyder, Raw Talent III
 Anne Randall, Sinners
|-
! style="background:#89cff0" width="50%" | Best Art Direction
! style="background:#89cff0" width="50%" | Best Musical Score
|-
| valign="top" |
 Maxine
 Dreams in the Forbidden Zone
 Miami Spice II
 Pillowman
 Sinners
| valign="top" |
 Taboo VI
 Cabaret Sin
 Dreams in the Forbidden Zone
 Hawaii Vice
 Sensual Escape
|-
! style="background:#89cff0" width="50%" | Best Film Editing
! style="background:#89cff0" width="50%" | Best Video Editing
|-
| valign="top" |
 Alex de Renzy, Pretty Peaches II
 Lucas Tele Productions, Amanda by Night II
 Giorgio Grande, Devil in Mr. Holmes
 Leon Gucci, Head Waitress
 David Marsh, Miami Spice
| valign="top" |
 John Leslie, Cat Woman
 Michael Cates, Addicted to Love
 Gerard Damiano, Paula Damiano; Candy’s Little Sister Sugar
 James MacReading, Dreams in the Forbidden Zone
 Alex de Renzy, Ghostess with the Mostess
 Marshall Dylan, Hard Core Cafe
 Arthur King, Maxine
 Adam Della, Pacific Intrigue
 John Leslie, Pillowman
 Gloria Leonard, James MacReading, Per Sjostedt; Sensual Escape
|-
! style="background:#89cff0" width="50%" | Best Cinematography
! style="background:#89cff0" width="50%" | Best Videography
|-
| valign="top" |
 Mr. Ed, Miami Spice II
 Jack Remy, Amanda by Night II
 L. Vincent Revene, Deep Inside Trading
 Jim Slater, Portrait of an Affair
 Alex de Renzy, Pretty Peaches II
| valign="top" |
 Jack Remy, Cat Woman
 Michael Cates, Addicted to Love
 Scotty Fox, Case of the Sensuous Sinners
 Michael Cates, Conflict
 Jane Waters, John Stagliano; Dance Fire
 Pablo La Pel, Jane Waters; Dreams in the Forbidden Zone
 Tom Hawaii, Pacific Intrigue
 Jack Remy, Pillowman
 Mot Rebrag, Sensual Escape
 Robert McCallum, Taboo VI
|-
! style="background:#89cff0" width="50%" | Best Boxcover Concept
! style="background:#89cff0" width="50%" | Best Overall Marketing Campaign
|-
| valign="top" |
 Screwdriver, Coast to Coast Video Amateur Night, Coast to Coast Video
 Broadway Brat, Vivid Video
 Conflict,  Vidco
 Hawaii Vice, CDI Home Video
 Heiress, Vivid Video
 Last Temptations of Kristi, Moonlight Entertainment
 Loose Ends V, 4-Play Video
 Miami Spice II, Caballero Home Video
 Where the Boys Aren’t, Vivid Video
| valign="top" |
 Hawaii Vice, CDI Home Video Angel’s Back, Intropics Video
 Arrow Sell-Through Program, Arrow Films & Video
 Caballero Sell-Through Program, Caballero Home Video
 Conflict, Vidco
 Devil in Mr. Holmes, Paradise Visuals
 Good Morning Saigon, Zane Entertainment Group
 Loose Ends V, 4-Play Video
 VCA Sell-Through Program, VCA Pictures
 Vidway's Debut, Vidway
|-
! style="background:#89cff0" width="50%" | Best Packaging
! style="background:#89cff0" width="50%" | Best Packaging—Gay Vide
|-
| valign="top" |
 Broadway Brat, Vivid Video Back to Rears, Vivid Video
 Debbie 4 Hire, AVC
 The Final Taboo, Caballero Home Video
 Hawaii Vice, CDI Home Video
 Heiress, Vivid Video
 Jamie Loves Jeff, Vivid Video
 Miami Spice II, Caballero Home Video
 Screwdriver, Coast to Coast Video
 Sex Lies, Fantasy Home Video
| valign="top" |
 In the Raw, In Hand Video
 In the Black, In Hand Video
 Mannequin Man, Vivid Video
 My Best Buddy, Catalina Video
 Ranch Hand, In Hand Video
 The Rites of Summer, Vivid Video
 Streaks, In Hand Video
 Stryker Force, Huge Video
 Superhunks, Vivid Video
 Taxi, In Hand Video
|}

Honorary AVN Awards

Special Achievement Award
AVN Special Achievement Awards were given to three industry members for their legal battles:
 Marty Rothstein of Model Distributors
 Steve Touchin of Bijou Video
 Hal Freeman of Hollywood Video

Hall of Fame
AVN Hall of Fame inductees for 1989 were: Annette Haven, Tracey Adams, Nina Hartley, Sharon Mitchell, Amber Lynn, Paul Thomas, Alex de Renzy, Henri Pachard. They were all nominated by the readership of Adult Video News magazine.

Multiple nominations and awards

The following movies received the most nominations:

The following nine movies received multiple awards:

Presenters and performers

The following individuals presented awards or performed musical numbers.

Presenters

Among those presenting awards were: Samantha Strong, Angel Kelly, Tom Steele, Megan Leigh and Jerry Butler.

Performers

Actor John Leslie opened the show by singing and playing harmonica. The Moonlight Entertainers were the live band during the show.

Ceremony information

This was the fourth live AVN awards show (there was no show the first two years), and at the time, was the last show still known as the "AVNA Awards" show. It was also the first one that charged admission, with profits going to the Adult Video Association for a legal cause. The event ran 110 minutes.Hustler magazine said, “The ceremony itself is every bit as tedious as these things have the potential to be.”

Plaques were awarded for Best Selling Adult Tape of the Year to Miami Spice II and for Best Renting Adult Tape of the Year to Devil in Mr. Holmes''.

See also

 AVN Award for Best Actress
 AVN Award for Best Supporting Actress
 AVN Award for Male Performer of the Year
 AVN Award for Male Performer of the Year
 AVN Award for Female Foreign Performer of the Year
 AVN Female Performer of the Year Award
 List of members of the AVN Hall of Fame

References

Bibliography

External links
 
 Adult Video News Awards  at the Internet Movie Database

AVN Awards
1988 film awards
AVN Awards 6